Aaron Brewer may refer to:

Aaron Brewer (long snapper) (born 1990), American football player for the Arizona Cardinals
Aaron Brewer (offensive lineman) (born 1997), American football player for the Tennessee Titans